is a train station in Sasaguri, Fukuoka Prefecture, Japan.

Lines
The station is sometimes depicted on maps and timetables as part of the Fukuhoku Yutaka Line, of which the Sasaguri Line is a component.

Station layout 
The station consists of two side platforms serving two tracks at grade. A large station building in traditional Japanese architectural style houses a waiting room, a shop and a ticket window staffed by a kan'i itaku ticket agent. From the ticket gate, passengers enter an underpass which leads to two flights of steps, giving access to the two platforms. A large parking lot is available at the station forecourt.

Adjacent stations

History
With the privatization of JNR on 1 April 1987, JR Kyushu took over control of the station. On 15 March 2003, the station name was changed to "Kido-Nanzōin-mae".

Passenger statistics
In fiscal 2016, the daily average number of passengers using the station (boarding only) was less than 323 but more than 100. It did not rank among the top 300 busiest stations operated by JR Kyushu.

References

External links
Kido-Nanzōin-mae| (JR Kyushu)

Railway stations in Fukuoka Prefecture
Railway stations in Japan opened in 1968